Grand Valley may refer to:

United States
 Grand Valley (Colorado-Utah), along the Colorado River
 Grand Valley AVA, Colorado wine region
 Grand Valley, Colorado, town now named Parachute, Colorado
 Grand Valley, Michigan
 Grand Valley, Pennsylvania
 Grand Valley State University in Allendale, Michigan
 Grand Valley State Lakers, this school's athletic program

Canada
 Grand Valley, Ontario
 Grand Valley, Saskatchewan

Indonesia
 Grand Valley, better known as the Baliem Valley, Western New Guinea, home of the Dani people

Fictional
 Grand Valley Speedway, a track in the Gran Turismo series of videogames